QSvn is a Subversion client.
It is released under the GPLv2 License.
The development of QSvn stopped in 2010.

It provides an interface to perform the most common revision control operations as a standalone GUI.

See also 

 Subversion - an open-source application used for revision control
 Comparison of Subversion clients

References

External links
 Official website

Apache Subversion
Software that uses Qt